The social movement of Meitei language (officially called Manipuri language) to attain linguistic purism is advocated by  literary, political, social associations and organisations as well as notable individual personalities of Bangladesh, Myanmar, Northeast India (prominently Assam, Manipur and Tripura).

Manipuri Lexicon Committee and its efforts

Formation of the Manipuri Lexicon Committee and its warnings   
During August 2014, Meetei Erol Eyek Loinasillol Apunba Lup (MEELAL) appealed to all the writers of works in Meitei language in Manipur to avoid the usage of loanwords from other languages. A state level "Manipuri Lexicon Committee" was formed to investigate if there is any word of other languages being used in any books of Meitei literature (Manipuri literature). After the approval of the "Manipuri Lexicon Committee", books for Meitei literature for educational standards, 9th and 10th for the academic session of the year 2015 was availed during September 2014. MEELAL warned that they will cease any book publication if a single book is published, abiding the restrictions on loanwords. MEELAL also announced that the literary departments should not keep any books that abide the restrictions of MEELAL.

Tearing and Banning of books 

During December 2014, MEELAL tore and banned three Meitei language books, for containing non native words, after getting examined by the Lexicon Committee. Earlier, the Lexicon Committee summoned the authors of the books for correction of the language, but they didn't come. Afterwards, MEELAL tore and banned the books. The names of the three books are (1) "Kainya" (poem collection) by Punshiba Soibam, (2) "Sahitya Neinarol Anouba" (prose) by Bhorot Sanasam, (3) "Manglan Khara Saktam Khara" (short story) by Khundongbam Gokulchandra. MEELAL will banned the books until the authors came to the office of the MEELAL and the Lexicon Committee for correction.

Verification of academic textbooks for students 
During December 2014, MEELAL investigated if there is any content of foreign language words in the books published by the "Board of Secondary Education, Manipur" (BOSEM) for the educational academic standards, 1st to 10th.

Banning of a film and its director 

During December 2014, MEELAL banned Meitei language film named "Court Marriage" and its director "Bimol Phibou". The film was banned for the presence of foreign language words. The director was banned for not responding to the organization's summons.

Banning songs of fusional languages in radio and television channels 

During February 2015, Meetei Erol Eyek Loinasillol Apunba Lup (MEELAL) took up measures to ban the broadcasting of songs in fusional forms of Meitei language (Manipuri language) on the mass media channels of All India Radio (AIR), Imphal and Doordarshan Kendra (DDK), Imphal.

Airport renaming into non-native language's name and public reactions 

During August 2019, the Manipur Legislative Assembly, led by Chief Minister Nongthombam Biren Singh, renamed "Tulihal International Airport" (also known as Imphal International Airport for being located in Imphal) as "Bir Tikendrajit International Airport". It was strongly opposed by SEACO (South East Asia Cultural Organisation) because of not using indigenous term in the renamed title and again because of not consulting people of Manipur before renaming. At the same time, Indigenous People's Association of Kangleipak (IPAK) urged the Manipur Government to withdraw its decision and rename the airport using indigenous names (words). The former official name "Tulihal International Airport" was named after "Ebudhou Tulihal", a Meitei guardian deity of the area of the airport. The association suggested that "Athouba Koirengsana" (which is a Meitei language name of Bir Tikendrajit himself) could be used to rename "Bir Tikendrajit International Airport" as the term "Bir Tikendrajit" isn't indigenous Meitei language name. The association said that the "Athouba Koirengsana International Airport" (a proposed title using indigenous equivalent name of the same person) will be more acceptable to the people of Manipur. The "Khongjom War Memorial Trust" also showed opposition to the government's action.

Plan to rename traditional script into non-native language's name and public reactions

Oppositions to 2021 governmental sanskritisation attempts 

During December 2021, Meetei Erol Eyek Loinasillol Apunba Lup (MEELAL) showed strong opposition to the Government of Manipur's Education Minister’s announcement regarding the initiatives in renaming of the pure Meitei term "Meetei Mayek" (lit. "Meetei script") into mixed term, "Manipuri Mayek" (lit. "Manipuri script"). MEELAL warned the minister that the general public along with the MEELAL are ready for agitation if he (the minister) tries to rename Meetei Mayek into "Manipuri Mayek".

Oppositions to 2022 governmental sanskritisation attempts 

During June 2022, Government of Manipur once again planned to officially rename the Meitei script from "Meetei Mayek" into "Manipuri Mayek". MEELAL resisted against the Government of Manipur's decision to change the nomenclature from Meetei Mayek (as already published in the "Manipur Gazettee") to "Manipur Mayek". At the same time, MEELAL urged the people of Manipur for public participation in it.

See also 
 Hindi imposition
 Sanskritisation
 Manipur (Mahabharata)
 Anti-Hindi agitations of Tamil Nadu
 Pure Tamil movement, a movement of linguistic purism of Tamil language attempting to avoid loanwords borrowed from Sanskrit
 Beka Melayu, a project for linguistic purism of Malay (and Indonesian) language, attempting to avoid loanwords borrowed from Sanskrit, Arabic, Persian, etc. 
 Linguistic purism in English, attempts to remove loanwords borrowed from Old French, Greek and Latin languages
 Linguistic purism in Korean, attempts to remove loanwords borrowed from Japanese

Notes

References

External links 
 
 
 

Meitei language movements